Lake Zungarococha (possibly from Quechua sunkaru a South American cat fish, qucha lake, is a lake in Peru. It lies near the Nanay River, southwest of Iquitos, in the Loreto Region, Maynas Province, San Juan Bautista District.

See also
List of lakes in Peru

References

Lakes of Loreto Region
Lakes of Peru